Tilli is a surname. Notable people with the surname include: 

Endre Tilli (1922–1958), Hungarian fencer
Michelangelo Tilli (1655–1740), Italian physician and botanist
Stefano Tilli (born 1962), Italian sprinter

See also
Tillis